C. maxima may refer to:

 Canna maxima, a perennial plant
 Cattleya maxima, a plant with a yellow stripe on its flower lip
 Cecropia maxima, a plant endemic to Ecuador
 Chrysoglossa maxima, a Central American moth
 Citrus maxima, a plant native to Asia
 Collocalia maxima, a cave-nesting swift
 Coracina maxima, a bird endemic to Australia
 Corylus maxima, an Old World hazel
 Crocomela maxima, a Bolivian moth
 Cucurbita maxima, a squash native to South America